Common Practice is a live album by American jazz pianist Ethan Iverson's quartet featuring trumpeter Tom Harrell. The album was released on 20 September 2019 by the ECM label. The album was recorded in Village Vanguard in January 2017.

Reception
In his review AllMusic's Matt Collar wrote "It's that kind of deft spontaneity that makes Common Practice an endlessly engaging listen." Bill Milkowski of DownBeat stated " Throughout the program, Iverson simultaneously offers a heartfelt love letter to standards while spray-painting his own tag all over them. The star here is Harrell, and the man behind the curtain is Iverson." Larry Blumenfeld of The Wall Street Journal commented "This album answers jazz’s current existential question—should we swing or not?—with an emphatic affirmative. Yet it doesn’t sound nostalgic or even terribly conventional, owing to the relaxed and elastic feel achieved by this rhythm section."

Dave Gelly of The Guardian added "Another live album by a jazz quartet playing Great American Songbook tunes? Er, well, up to a point. There are certainly eight vintage standards here, along with a bebop classic and two originals, but I wouldn’t recommend any of them as singalong material." Paddy Kehoe of RTÉ.ie stated " It is pleasant but not overly-so. God forbid you might feel too idyllic, then it's not real enough. In short, the work here is not intended to frighten the horses." Andy Hamilton of Jazz Journal noted "Harrell’s solos in particular, in their apparent simplicity, pathos and melodic beauty, are some of the finest you’ll hear among this year’s releases. As it’s ECM, the live recording is palpably present."

JazzTimes included the album in its list of "Top 50 Albums of 2019".

Track listing

Personnel
Ethan Iverson – piano
Ben Street – double bass
Eric McPherson – drums
Tom Harrell – trumpet

References

2019 live albums
ECM Records albums
Ethan Iverson albums
Albums produced by Manfred Eicher
Tom Harrell albums
Albums recorded at the Village Vanguard